The 2022 A-Leagues All Stars Game was the third edition of the A-Leagues All Stars Game, and the first since the 2014 Game. It was held at Accor Stadium in Sydney on 25 May 2022 against Spanish club Barcelona. Barcelona won the game 3–2.

The game was televised in Australia on Network 10.

Pre-match
Having not played an All Stars game since the 2014 edition against Juventus, on 6 April 2022, the A-Leagues announced the return of the concept for the match against Barcelona. It is the first time Barcelona has visited Australia.

The game was in the same week as the 2022 A-League Men Grand Final. Players participating in the Grand Final did not play in the All Stars Game.

On 27 April 2022, it was announced that former Sydney FC midfielder Dwight Yorke will coach the A-Leagues All-Stars. The appointment was criticised by Football Coaches Australia, who argued that the All Stars coach should be an A-League Men or Australian national team coach. On 13 May 2022, it was announced that Yorke's assistants would be Rob Stanton, Heather Garriock and goalkeeping coach Davide Del Giovine.

The match was Barcelona's first ever game in Australia, the 68th country in which Barcelona has played.

Squads

A-Leagues All Stars
On 5 May 2022, it was announced that the A-Leagues All Stars squad would consist of thirty players: 13 selected by a fan vote, 15 selected by Dwight Yorke and his assistants and two selected by A-Leagues commissioner Greg O'Rourke. Every A-League Men club had at least one player selected. While players participating in the 2022 A-League Men Grand Final were unable to play in the All Stars Game, they remained eligible for inclusion in the squad with "non-playing" status.

The initial thirteen players, selected by fan vote, were named on 19 May 2022. The remaining seventeen squad members were named on 20 May 2022.

Barcelona
Barcelona's squad to travel to Australia was named on 22 May 2022.

Notes:
Injured or otherwise unable to play.

Match
The game was broadcast in Australia on Network 10.

Details

References

External links 
 Official Barca in Sydney website

2022
All Stars Game
A-Leagues All Stars Game 2022
A-Leagues All Stars Game